Arthur Coham (1721–1799) was the Archdeacon of Wilts from 5 March 1779 until his death.

Coham was educated at King's College, Cambridge. He was ordained deacon in May 1743, and priest in December of that year. He held livings at Somerton, Suffolk (from 1753); Potterne, Wiltshire (1781); and Brixton Deverill, Wiltshire (1781). From 1756 to 1759 he was chaplain to John Hume, bishop of Bristol.

He died on 14 February 1799.

References

Alumni of King's College, Cambridge
Archdeacons of Wilts
1721 births
1799 deaths